The Speaker of the Flemish Parliament is the presiding member of the Flemish Parliament, which is the legislature of Flanders (Belgium). The speaker is elected at the beginning of each parliamentary year, on the fourth Monday in September. The Speaker chairs the plenary sessions of the Flemish Parliament and acts as its official representative. The speaker determines whether a certain initiative is admissible and thus can be put to parliament at all. The Flemish Ministers take the oath before the Speaker of the Flemish Parliament. Only the head of the Flemish government, the Minister-President of Flanders, takes the oath before the King. The Speaker also presides over the Bureau and the Extended Bureau of the Flemish Parliament and is assisted by four Deputy Speakers.

List of speakers of the Flemish Parliament

See also
Flemish Parliament

Politics of Belgium
Flemish Parliament
Belgium, Flemish Parliament